Parafossarulus sungariensis  is a species of freshwater snail with gills and an operculum, an aquatic prosobranch gastropod mollusk in the family Bithyniidae.

The specific name sungariensis comes from the name of the Sungari River, where this species was found.

Distribution 
This species occurs in Heilongjiang Province and in Jilin Province in northeastern China.

The type locality is the Sungari River basin, a small lake near Harbin.

Habitat 
Parafossarulus sungariensis lives in freshwater lakes and rivers.

References 

Bithyniidae
Gastropods described in 1987